James Francis Calvert (September 8, 1920 – June 3, 2009) served in the United States Navy, where he commanded , the third nuclear submarine commissioned and the second submarine to reach the North Pole, which became the first to surface at the pole. Skate surfaced at the North Pole on 17 March 1959 to commit the ashes of the famed explorer Sir Hubert Wilkins to the Arctic waste. He later served as the 46th superintendent of the United States Naval Academy.

Biography

Early life and education
Calvert was born on September 8, 1920, in Cleveland, and grew up as an only child. He attended Oberlin College for two years before receiving an appointment to the United States Naval Academy. He graduated on June 19, 1942, completing his coursework at the Naval Academy in three years under an accelerated wartime curriculum.

Military service
On Jack, Calvert was responsible for operating the Torpedo Data Computer, an electromechanical analog computer used for torpedo fire-control, and the ships on which he served sank 100,000 tons of enemy ships and damaged an additional 18,000 tons. He was awarded two Silver Stars and two Bronze Star Medals, along with a Letter of Commendation. He was on Haddo in Tokyo Bay during ceremonies for the Japanese surrender.

After the end of World War II, Calvert spent three years at the Submarine School as an instructor in the Torpedo Data Computer.

Although Skate first surfaced at the pole on March 17, 1959, Skate first went under the North Pole on August 11, 1958. In 1958 Skate was able to surface in the Arctic, but was unable to surface at the pole itself due to the thickness of the ice. The ability to travel under and break through the ice was a major achievement during the Cold War as it allows the Navy's submarines to avoid detection under the ice while being able to launch their Polaris missiles from points far closer to the Soviet Union. The following year, after traveling  to the pole in 12 days, Skate became the first submarine to surface through the ice when it reached the North Pole on March 17, 1959. There they released the ashes of Australian polar explorer Sir George Hubert Wilkins who died in November 1958 and who had been the first to try to reach the pole by submarine; Wilkins had flown over the pole but was never able to set foot there despite numerous attempts.

With the support of Admiral Hyman G. Rickover, Calvert rose to vice admiral. He was named as superintendent of the United States Naval Academy in 1968, where he introduced 20 different majors to midshipmen to replace a standardized curriculum of military courses that had previously been taken there. He was a former commander of the United States First Fleet.

Among the four books he wrote were Silent Running: My Years on a World War II Attack Submarine and the 1960 book Surface at the Pole: The Extraordinary Voyages of the U.S.S. Skate in which he described his experiences at the pole, reminiscing about a polar bear that went into the water, ignoring the submarine nearby.

Personal
His first marriage, to the Nancy Ridgeway King, ended with her death in 1965. Their daughter, Margaret, died in 1994. Calvert died at age 88 on June 3, 2009, at his home in Bryn Mawr, Pennsylvania due to heart failure. He was survived by his second wife, Margaretta Harrison Battle, whom he married in 1968. He was also survived by two sons from his first marriage, four stepsons and 15 grandchildren.

References

1920 births
2009 deaths
United States Navy personnel of World War II
Oberlin College alumni
Military personnel from Cleveland
Recipients of the Silver Star
American Polar Society honorary members
Submariners
Superintendents of the United States Naval Academy
United States Naval Academy alumni
United States Navy vice admirals
20th-century American non-fiction writers
20th-century American academics